Ketyan  is a Syrian village located in Taftanaz Nahiyah in Idlib District, Idlib.  According to the Syria Central Bureau of Statistics (CBS), Ketyan had a population of 1876 in the 2004 census.

References 

Populated places in Idlib District